Panakkara Pillai is a 1968 Indian Tamil-language film. It stars Jayalalithaa opposite Ravichandran. The supporting cast included Nagesh, S. N. Lakshmi and M. N. Nambiar. The story was written by Mahendran. The film has Ravichandran in a double role. It was a successful film on its release. The song "Maanikka Magudam", in particular was very popular from this film. The music was composed by S. M. Subbaiah Naidu. The film was released on 14 January 1968.

Plot

Cast 
 Jayalalithaa
 Ravichandran
 Nagesh
 Manorama
 V. K. Ramasamy
 Jyothi Lakshmi
 M. N. Nambiar
 M. R. R. Vasu

Soundtrack 
Lyrics were written by Vaali.
 "Maanikka Magudam" -
 "Eppothu Naadagathai" -
 "Namadhu Arasu" -
 "Parisam Potta maama" -

References

External links 
 

1968 films
1960s Tamil-language films
Films with screenplays by Mahendran (filmmaker)